United Arab Airlines Flight 749 was a scheduled international passenger flight on 18 March 1966 that crashed while attempting to land in Cairo, Egypt. All thirty passengers and crew on board were killed.

Crash
Flight 749 took off from Nicosia Airport bound for Cairo International Airport. En route, the aircraft encountered bad weather, and conditions were poor in Cairo due to the presence of sandstorms. The crew of Flight 749 contacted Mirsair's Operations about diversion options. The flight crew also reported they were flying through thunderstorms with icing conditions, that two of the aircraft's altimeters were giving different readings, the magnetic compass being unserviceable, and that there was a crack in a cockpit window panel due to the thunderstorms. After diverting was discussed, Flight 749 continued to Cairo. The flight was cleared for a Runway 23 approach but crashed approximately 5 kilometres from it. Everyone on board Flight 749 perished in the accident.

After the crash, the sandstorm hampered rescue operations. Visibility was near zero and rescue vehicles became bogged down in the drifting sands.

Investigation
Accident investigators determined that "the accident arose from the descent of the aircraft below the safe flight altitude in the final approach and the impact of the port wing against the sand dunes lying to the northeast of the aerodrome. As a result the pilot lost control of his aircraft and hit the ground.

It is probable that the cause of descent of the aircraft below the safe level was due to the change from IFR to VFR, taking into consideration that considerable time would have been needed for the pilot to have adapted to this change in the prevailing weather conditions."

See also
Stavropolskaya Aktsionernaya Avia Flight 1023, another aviation disaster involving an Antonov An-24 which took place exactly 31 years after Flight 749.

References

External links

Airliner accidents and incidents caused by pilot error
Airliner accidents and incidents caused by weather
Aviation accidents and incidents in 1966
Aviation accidents and incidents in Egypt
Accidents and incidents involving the Antonov An-24
749
1966 in Egypt
March 1966 events in Africa